Cannabis in Kenya is illegal.

History
Locally referred to as bhang, banghi, or bangi, cannabis was banned in Kenya during the British colonial East Africa Protectorate under the Opium Ordinance, effective 1 January 1914. However, there have been recent campaigns that have called for its legalization. For instance, former member of parliament for Kibra Constituency Ken Okoth advocated for its legalization on the basis of its medicinal values. In March 2019, the New York-based company GoIP Global Inc announced that it had obtained a license to grow cannabis, although their claim was denied by the Kenyan government.

Cultivation
Cannabis hotbeds in Kenya include Mount Kenya and Lake Victoria, with cultivation also being observed in the coastal regions of the country. Notable amounts of cannabis are smuggled out of the country by foreign visitors. In 1999, Kenyan authorities reportedly seized  of cannabis; however, there are no official crop size or yield estimates.

Consumption
Cannabis in Kenya is commonly available in joints that cost anywhere from 10 shillings to 100 shillings. According to a 1991 study, cannabis is the third most abused substance in Kenya, after alcohol and tobacco. According to a 2012 study by the National Agency for the Campaign Against Drug Abuse (NACADA), cannabis consumption was higher among men, the unemployed, and those residing in more urbanized areas, although consumption in rural areas was also increasing. The study also found that the most common users of cannabis in Kenya were aged 18 to 25 years.

Legislation
Cannabis consumption is illegal in Kenya, with offenders facing up to eight years (formerly fifteen) of imprisonment.

References

Kenya
Drugs in Kenya